Last Plane Out is a 1983 film, directed by David Nelson, son of Ozzie and Harriet.  It was based on journalist Jack Cox's (who co-produced the film) experience in Nicaragua when it was ruled by  Anastasio Somoza Debayle and his battle against insurgents during the 1979 Nicaraguan Revolution.

Plot

American journalist Jack Cox covers the Nicaraguan Revolution and falls in love with a pretty Sandinista rebel.

Principal cast

 Jan-Michael Vincent as Jack Cox
 Julie Carmen as Maria Cardena
 Mary Crosby as Elizabeth Rush
 David Huffman as Jim Conley
 Lloyd Battista as Anastasio Somoza Debayle
 Tonyo Meléndez as Ernesto
 Ronnie Gonzalez as Luis
 Anthony Feijoo as Ramon

References

External links

1983 films
1983 action films
American biographical films
American political thriller films
Films scored by Dennis McCarthy
Films about journalists
Films set in Nicaragua
Films shot in Miami
New World Pictures films
1983 thriller films
Nicaraguan Revolution
1980s English-language films
1980s American films